Clark Terry (also released as Introducing Clark Terry and Swahili) is the debut album by American jazz trumpeter Clark Terry featuring tracks recorded in early 1955 and released on the EmArcy label.

Reception

Allmusic awarded the album 4 and a half stars, stating: "There are no losers in this swinging meeting".

Track listing
All compositions by Clark Terry except as indicated
 "Swahili" (Quincy Jones) - 6:07    
 "Double Play" (Jones) - 3:33    
 "Slow Boat" - 4:28    
 "Co-Op" (Terry, Rick Henderson) - 3:45    
 "Kitten" - 5:35    
 "The Countess" (Freddie Green, Terry) - 6:42    
 "Tuma" (Jones) - 3:06    
 "Chuckles" - 4:19    
Recorded at Fine Sound Studios, New York City, on January 3 (tracks 1–4) and January 4 (tracks 5–8), 1955

Personnel 
Clark Terry - trumpet
Jimmy Cleveland - trombone
Cecil Payne - baritone saxophone
Horace Silver - piano
Wendell Marshall - bass
Oscar Pettiford - bass, cello
Art Blakey - drums
Quincy Jones - arranger

References 

1955 debut albums
Albums arranged by Quincy Jones
Clark Terry albums
EmArcy Records albums